Frank Hardart Murray (born 1953) is an American business executive.  He is founder, president and chief executive officer of InterTech Media and Zocle Media. In the 1990s, Murray was the chairman and CEO of Goodman Manufacturing Company who engineered Goodman's purchase of Amana Corporation from Raytheon and initiated Amana's successful brand-revitalization campaign. Under Murray, Goodman moved up Forbes' list of 500 Biggest Private Companies from #405 to 66. Murray has an MBA from Harvard Business School and a bachelor's degree in mathematics and economics from Ohio Wesleyan University.

Early life
Born in New York City and raised in Connecticut, Murray came from a family of entrepreneurs.  He is named after his maternal great grandfather, Frank Hardart, co-founder of Horn & Hardart, the company known for the Automats – the self serve cafeterias popular in Philadelphia and New York. On his father's side, he is the grandson of William J. Murray and the great-grandson of Samuel J. Murray, who revolutionized the manufacturing of playing cards through the United States Playing Card Company. On his grandmother's side he is the great-grandson of John F. Ahearn who was a prominent Tammany Hall leader and served as Manhattan Borough President from 1903–1909. His father, Samuel J. Murray, was a decorated veteran of World War II.

Career
Early in his career, Murray was a partner in the Beacon Group, a managing director of Mergers & Acquisitions at Merrill Lynch and a vice president at Dillon Read. At Dillon Read, he was a key member in the defense team for Unocal Corporation which prevented a takeover-attempt by T. Boone Pickens' Mesa Petroleum in 1985. The case resulted in the Delaware Supreme Court landmark decision Unocal v. Mesa Petroleum.

He first came into contact with Goodman Manufacturing, the largest privately held heating and air conditioning company in the United States, as a financial adviser to Goodman's founder, Harold Goodman.  When Harold Goodman died in January 1995, the Goodman family asked Murray to take his place as chairman and CEO at the company's headquarters in Houston, Texas, the following year.

At the time, Goodman was the number four heating and air conditioning company behind Carrier Corporation, and reaching market saturation. Murray saw Amana as "an opportunity to expand into new product lines with a well-known brand." The sale of Amana to Goodman was announced July 14, 1997. The deal included Amana's home appliance, commercial cooking and heating and air conditioning business, but not Raytheon's commercial laundry business. Amana was headquartered in Amana, Iowa, and had 5,500 employees.

In keeping with his promise to "enhance the Amana brand," Murray initiated a $20 million brand revitalization campaign for the long dormant Amana brand, by DDB Worldwide's New York branch. The ads, with the tag, "Built Better Than It Has To Be," featured female comedians, including Mad TV's Debra Wilson, on a bright pastel-colored background, talking about mishaps with refrigerators, ranges and washers and dryers and how Amana features can solve them.

Murray left Goodman in 1999 to return to his Connecticut roots and in 2000, launched InterTech Media. InterTech "is the world's fastest growing provider of Internet-based services to media companies. With more than 1,200 client radio and television station clients."

Personal life
In 1993, Murray married Sachi Parker, daughter of Shirley MacLaine and Steve Parker. They lived for a while in Houston, Texas, while Murray was the chairman and CEO of Goodman Holdings and Amana Appliances. The couple divorced in 2011. The couple have two children, a son, Frank Murray Jr. (born 1996), and a daughter, Arin Murray (born 1998).

References

1953 births
Living people
American people of German descent
American people of Irish descent
Businesspeople from New York (state)
Harvard Business School alumni
American chief executives of manufacturing companies
Ohio Wesleyan University alumni